The Olonets Government was a short-lived state that existed in 1920 in the southern part of modern-day Republic of Karelia in Russia. The government formed in Olonets in May 1920, before fleeing to Finland in August the same year when its territories were captured by the Russian Red Army. On 20 December 1920 the Olonets government merged with the Republic of Uhtua to form the Karelian United Government.

References

States and territories established in 1920
States and territories disestablished in 1920
1920 in Finland
Russian Civil War
History of the Republic of Karelia